James Elder (5 March 1928 – September 2022) was a Scottish professional footballer who played as a wing half for Football League club Portsmouth, where he was part of the squad that went on to win the Division 1 Championship and Colchester United, where he made over 200 appearances and scoring 17 goals. Jimmy was a hard-hitting wing-half who could play with both feet. Jimmy was also a regular penalty-taker.

He died in September 2022, at the age of 94. He was the last remaining member of Portsmouth's famous title-winning squad of 1948–49 and 1949–50.

References

External links
 
 Jimmy Elder at Colchester United Archive Database

1928 births
2022 deaths
Scottish footballers
Association football wing halves
English Football League players
Colchester United F.C. players
Portsmouth F.C. players
Yeovil Town F.C. players
Jeanfield Swifts F.C. players